Trechus galianus is a species of ground beetle in the subfamily Trechinae. It was described by Belousov in 1989.

References

galianus
Beetles described in 1989